Fellows of the Royal Society elected in 1732.

Fellows

 Vincent Bacon (died 1739), surgeon 
 Robert Barker (died 1745), physician 
 Sir Edward Barry, 1st Baronet (1696–1776), Irish physician 
 Jean Baptiste Bassand (1680–1742), French physician 
 John Belchier (1706–1785), surgeon 
 William Clavering-Cowper, 2nd Earl Cowper (1709–1764), courtier 
 Thomas Lee Dummer (c.1712–1765), MP 
 Sir James Edwards, 2nd Baronet (c.1689–1744) 
 Rose Fuller (1708–1777), landowner and MP 
 Jean Patrice Piers de Girardin
 John Gray (died 1769), Naval mathematician and engineer 
 Fayrer Hall (died c.1756) 
 John Lindsay, 20th Earl of Crawford (1702–1749)
 Conde de Montijo (1693-1763)
 Louis Jouard de La Nauze (1696–1773), French 
 Baron Pfutschner (died 1752) 
 John Robartes, 4th Earl of Radnor (c.1686–1757) 
 Jacob Serenius (1700–1776), Swedish cleric 
 James Lyon Strathmore (1702–1735) Scottish peer
 Johann Friedrich Weidler (1691–1755), Mathematician

References

1732 in science
1732
1732 in Great Britain